Unreal Championship 2: The Liandri Conflict is a first- and third-person arena shooter video game developed by Epic Games and published by Midway Games. It was released in April 2005 for Xbox. The game is part of the Unreal franchise, and is a direct sequel to 2002's Unreal Championship (itself a port of the PC game Unreal Tournament 2003). Unreal Championship 2 was designed from the ground up to take full advantage of the Xbox Live gaming service.

Gameplay 

Unreal Championship 2 features 14 different characters from the Unreal universe, plus extra characters released in a bonus pack via Xbox Live. Other additions include the new gametypes Overdose and Nali Slaughter, new weapons including melee weapons, and more adrenaline combos than in previous games.

Unreal Championship 2 adds melee combat to the series by allowing characters to switch to their respective weapon, such as a blade or staff. Players can also perform special "Fatality" moves very much like Mortal Kombat, another game series by Midway. Players can use melee weapons only in third-person mode, but can switch between first- and third-person mode on the fly while using firearms.

Unreal Championship 2 also uses a mechanic that deviates from the standard Unreal Tournament line of games, wherein each character has a designation of light, medium, or heavy, that determines the health, melee weapon damage, movement speed and agility of the characters. Light characters have the least amount of health and melee weapon damage, but are faster and more agile than the other types. Medium characters are in the middle for all three attributes. Heavy characters have the most life and melee weapon damage, but are the slowest and least agile of the three.

Another addition is the lock on mechanic, which keeps the locked on character in front of the player. While it doesn't center the enemy in front of weapon firing reticules, it does keep the character on the screen until either the player unlocks them, kills or is killed by them, or the locked on character is out of line of sight. This mechanic helps alleviate the imprecision of analog sticks on the console, as opposed to using a mouse and keyboard on the PC platform, especially when circle strafing and to make melee attacks easier to control.

Adrenaline use is unique to Unreal Championship 2, compared to other Unreal Tournament games. Each character has six adrenaline powers at their disposal. All characters have access to speed, which grants increased movement speed for a short time, and nimble, which makes characters float while jumping, and allows for additional jumps beyond the double jump. Each race in the game, human, Nakhti, Necris, Skaarj, Juggernaut, and mechanical, then each have their own race specific powers. Some characters also have unique adrenaline powers. Adrenaline is gained slowly throughout the match, but is gained faster for kills and killing spree awards. There are also adrenaline pickups on the maps. Each power uses a set amount of adrenaline to activate, ranging from one quarter of the total adrenaline meter, to needing a completely full adrenaline meter to use.

Story mode 
The story mode has players take the role of Anubis, who left the previous Ascension Rights tournament for the title of Nakhti Emperor, and has become a soldier in the military. He returns to the tournament when he sees his former betrothed, Selket, announcing her intention to win the Ascension Rights tournament after the previous winner has fallen gravely ill and must abdicate the throne. Selket has made a deal with The Liandri Corporation to broadcast the tournament to the rest of the galaxy. Players progress through various modes as Anubis, interspersed with voice acted in game engine cut scenes that explain more of the story as they make their way through the game. Eventually, the only two competitors left are Anubis and Selket, with the final match having the respawn mechanics removed for the final kill. Anubis is successful, but is heartbroken that he had to kill the woman he loved. He is then approached by a representative of The Liandri Corporation who offers him a deal to bring Selket back to life through the Necris Process—so long as he continues to fight in the various tournaments run by the corporation; since even the emperor can't afford the process. Anubis reluctantly agrees, saying he doesn't deserve to be the Nakhti Emperor. The final scene shows Anubis about to address his people as their new emperor, with a Necris version of Selket behind him.

Anubis, Selket, and various other Nakhti characters were added for this game.

Tournament and Challenge modes 
Unreal Championship 2 also has additional single-player modes, the Tournament mode and Challenge mode. Tournament mode is a ladder-styled arcade-style mode allowing players to play as different characters in the game through a set number of matches. Challenge mode has players attempting challenges of varying difficulty in single matches. Completing these modes unlocks different mutators and characters for use in multiplayer or single-player vs bot games.

Multiplayer 
Before a multiplayer game starts, the host can change gravity, regenerate health, and otherwise modify gameplay with "mutators" as is common in the Unreal series of games.

Multiplayer games are eight player maximum games, and can be free for all modes, such as normal deathmatch, or team-based games such as team deathmatch and capture the flag. Unreal Championship 2 shipped with 50 multiplayer maps to play the various modes on, with maps designated for certain gametypes. Online multiplayer features are no-longer available on Xbox Live with the discontinuation of all original Xbox online features.

Development 
Unreal Championship 2 began development after Unreal Tournament 2003 was released and a planned sequel was in the works for the PC. Unreal Championship 2 came as a result of a possible console port of Unreal Tournament 2005 (which was instead changed to Unreal Tournament 3 after the branching off). Epic Games decided to move the game over to the consoles and became a three-game contract between Midway Games and Epic Games. With the Midway publishing deal, Raiden from the Mortal Kombat series of games, which Midway owned before its bankruptcy, was added as an unlockable playable character. Additionally, players could switch from the normal Unreal Tournament male announcer to the announcer from the Mortal Kombat games being published at that time.

The game was built on a custom version of Unreal Engine 2.5, dubbed 'Unreal Engine 2X'. Created specifically for the Xbox console by Epic Games, the engine could push "3-4 times the polygons of the original Unreal Championship game..." and for its time "outperform[ed] most current generation PC games even though they run on much faster CPUs". Part of the reason the game was very detailed, and could rival PC games of that time was due to the engine's memory enhancements which allowed them to reduce the console memory footprint and manage leaks more efficiently.

Leak
On July 31, 2021, a leak of an unfinished Windows port appeared online.

Soundtrack 

The soundtrack for Unreal Championship 2 was composed by Kevin Riepl.

Reception 

Unreal Championship 2 has an 85 average on Metacritic.

References

External links
 Official website

2005 video games
First-person shooters
Hero shooters
Midway video games
Arena shooters
Cancelled Windows games
Multiplayer online games
Unreal (video game series)
Unreal Engine games
Video game sequels
Xbox games
Xbox-only games
Epic Games games
Video games about death games
Video games developed in the United States
Multiplayer and single-player video games